Henry Vane, 2nd Earl of Darlington (1726 – 8 September 1792) was a British peer.

Life
He was the son of the 1st Earl of Darlington and educated at Christ Church, Oxford, graduating with a MA on 3 July 1749.

He joined the Army as an Ensign in the 1st Regiment of Foot Guards in 1745. He was subsequently promoted lieutenant and captain, and went to the 2nd Regiment of Foot Guards as captain and lieutenant-colonel on 6 February 1750. He retired from the army in June 1758, having succeeded as 2nd Earl of Darlington on the death of his father. He was then appointed Lord Lieutenant of County Durham from 1758-death, Governor of Carlisle from 1763-death and Master of the Jewel Office from 1763 to 1782.

From 1749 to 1753 he was Whig Member of Parliament (MP) for Downton and from 1753 to 1758 for County Durham. He had a London home at Grosvenor Square.

Having inherited Raby Castle, County Durham in 1758, Vane continued his father's work to convert the castle into a residential mansion with the help of architect John Carr. He died in 1792 at Raby Castle and was buried there. He was succeeded by his only son William Harry Vane, 3rd Earl of Darlington, who was later made Duke of Cleveland.

Family
Vane married Margaret Lowther, a daughter of Robert Lowther, the Governor of Barbados, on 19 March 1757 in London. They had four children:

Lady Grace Vane (b. & d. 1757), died in infancy.
Lady Margaret Vane (b 1758)
Lady Elizabeth Vane (1759–1765), died young.
William Vane, 1st Duke of Cleveland (1766–1842)

References 

1726 births
1792 deaths
Alumni of Christ Church, Oxford
Grenadier Guards officers
Earls in the Peerage of Great Britain
Lord-Lieutenants of Durham
Vane, Henry
British MPs 1747–1754
British MPs 1754–1761
Henry
Masters of the Jewel Office
Barons Barnard
Coldstream Guards officers